Noipa Kam is a populated place situated on the Tohono O'odham Indian Reservation in Pima County, Arizona, United States. Its name is derived from the O'odham place name, nowipakam.

References

Populated places in Pima County, Arizona